The 1926 Wyoming gubernatorial election took place on November 3, 1926. Incumbent Democratic Governor Nellie Tayloe Ross, first elected in the 1924 special election, ran for re-election to a second term. She was narrowly defeated by the Republican nominee, former State Engineer Frank Emerson.

Democratic primary

Candidates
 Nellie Tayloe Ross, incumbent Governor

Results

Republican Primary

Candidates
 Frank Emerson, State Engineer
 Frank Lucas, Secretary of State, former Governor
 H. A. Lathrop, physician (dropped out)

General election

Results

References

1926 Wyoming elections
1926
Wyoming